Stade Municipal, also known as the Lamido Yaya Dairou Stadium, is a multi-use stadium in Maroua, Cameroon. It is currently used for football matches and has also hosted university graduations and political events such as election rallies. It serves as a home ground of Sahel FC. The stadium holds 5,000 people.

References 
Football venues in Cameroon